Pierre (I) d’Orgemont (c. 1315, Lagny-sur-Marne - 23 June 1389, hôtel des Tournelles, Paris) was a French politician of the Hundred Years' War era.

Life 
He seems to have been the son of Jean d’Orgemont, a middle-class man from Lagny who owned buildings on rue Saint-Antoine in Paris, or the son of the Pierre d’Orgemont who appears in the wills of Louis X and  Philippe le Long.

Pierre d’Orgemont studied law and began his career as a mere lawyer in 1340 in the Parlement de Paris where he was made master clerk in May 1347 then first president in 1355. He proved loyal to the French crown during John II of France's captivity in France after capture at the battle of Poitiers, notably during the revolt of the Estates General in 1357 led by Étienne Marcel. This gained d'Orgemont recognition from the dauphin, the future Charles V of France. On 20 November 1373 he became the only ever chancellor of France to be elected by a college of electors. This college had been summoned together by Charles V:

Such a procedure was never revived by Charles' successors.

At Christmas 1373 Pierre d'Orgemont was made a knight. He remained chancellor until his retirement in 1380, following the death of Charles, who made him executor of his will - he then became maître des requêtes to the parlement de Paris. He also contributed to editing the Grandes Chroniques de France for 1350-1380. In 1384 he was made chancellor of the Dauphiné by Charles VI of France. On 26 May 1386 he bought the lordship of Chantilly from the last Bouteillier de Senlis. He soon began to build an impressive moated château, completed after his death by his son Amaury.

Titles and lands

Descendants and succession

References

Bibliography 
  Léon Mirot, Les d’Orgemont, leur origine, leur fortune, le boiteux d’Orgemont, Champion, Paris, 1913
  Georges Bordonove, Les Rois qui ont fait la France - Les Valois - Charles V le Sage, vol 1, éditions Pygmalion, 1988.

External links
 Election of Pierre d'Orgemont as chancellor of France

1315 births
1389 deaths
People from Lagny-sur-Marne
People of the Hundred Years' War
Chancellors of France